Dieter 'Hoppi' Kurrat (15 May 1942 – 27 October 2017) was a German football player and coach. His brother, Hans-Jürgen Kurrat, also played football professionally.

Career
As a player, he spent nine seasons in the Bundesliga (a German professional association football league) with Borussia Dortmund. Nicknamed "Hoppy", he became a club legend, winning the German Championship, the DFB Cup, in 1965 and the European Cup Winner's Cup in 1966.

Death
Kurrat died on 27 October 2017.

Honours
 UEFA Cup Winners' Cup winner: 1965–66
 Bundesliga runner-up: 1965–66
 DFB-Pokal winner: 1964–65; finalist 1962–63

References

External links
 

1942 births
2017 deaths
German footballers
Borussia Dortmund players
Bundesliga players
German football managers
Borussia Dortmund managers
Association football midfielders
Footballers from Dortmund
West German footballers
West German football managers